Vertigo antivertigo is a species of minute air-breathing land snail, a terrestrial pulmonate gastropod mollusc or micromollusc in the family Vertiginidae, the whorl snails.

Distribution 
This species occurs in countries and islands including:
 Czech Republic
 Netherlands
 Poland
 Slovakia
 Ukraine
 Great Britain
 Ireland
 Pakistan

Shell description 
The shell is rimate, oval, ventricose, nearly smooth, glossy, amber-brown or nearly chestnut, slightly transparent, outlines very convex. Whorls are rather convex, the last somewhat compressed below, with an impression over the lower palatal fold, a moderately developed, opaque crest behind the peristome; and a very deep impression between the crest and the point of the outer lip.

Aperture having 6 principal and usually several smaller teeth: parietal lamella rather long; angular and infraparietal short and smaller. Columellar 
lamella large, ascending inwardly. Upper and lower palatal folds strong, the lower longer. Basal fold stout, in a subcolumellar position. Usually there are small suprapalatal and infrapalatal denticles. Peristome is thin, a little expanded, the outer margin biarcuate, with a median entering angle. Palatal callus is well developed.

The width of the adult shell varies from 1.2 to 1.4 mm, the height from 1.95-2.25 mm.

References
This article incorporates public domain text from reference.

 Bank, R. A.; Neubert, E. (2017). Checklist of the land and freshwater Gastropoda of Europe. Last update: July 16th, 2017
 Connolly, M. (1939). A monographic survey of South African non-marine Mollusca. Annals of the South African Museum. 33: 1-660. page(s): 403
 Sysoev, A. V. & Schileyko, A. A. (2009). Land snails and slugs of Russia and adjacent countries. Sofia/Moskva (Pensoft). 312 pp., 142 plates.
 erbert, D.G. (2010). The introduced terrestrial Mollusca of South Africa. SANBI Biodiversity Series, 15: vi + 108 pp. Pretoria.

External links
 801) Draparnaud, J. P. R. (1801). Tableau des mollusques terrestres et fluviatiles de la France. Montpellier / Paris (Renaud / Bossange, Masson & Besson). 1-116.
 Mousson, A. (1873). Coquilles recueillies par M. le Dr Sievers dans la Russie Méridionale et Asiatique. Journal de Conchyliologie, 21 (3): 193-230, pl. 7-8. Paris
 Pokryszko, B. M., Auffenberg, K., Hlaváč, J. Č. & Naggs, F. (2009). Pupilloidea of Pakistan (Gastropoda: Pulmonata): Truncatellininae, Vertigininae, Gastrocoptinae, Pupillinae (In Part). Annales Zoologici. 59(4): 423-458
 Schileyko, A. A. & Rymzhanov, T. S. (2013). Fauna of land mollusks (Gastropoda, Pulmonata Terrestria) of Kazakhstan and adjacent territories. Moscow-Almaty: KMK Scientific Press. 389 pp
 Vertigo antivergo at Animalbase taxonomy,short description, distribution, biology,status (threats), images
 MNHN, Paris: specimen

antivertigo
Gastropods described in 1801
Molluscs of Pakistan
Taxobox binomials not recognized by IUCN